Jaime Botín-Sanz de Sautuola y García de los Ríos (born 10 April 1936) is a Spanish billionaire heir, banker and art collector.

Early life
Botín was born in 1936. His father Emilio Botín (1903–1993) and elder brother Emilio Botín have been chairman of the Santander Group, and following his death in 2014, was succeeded by his daughter (Jaime's niece) Ana Patricia Botín.

He received a law degree from the University of Valladolid and an economics degree from the University of Deusto.

Career
He served as Vice Chairman of the Santander Bank in the 1990s. He resigned in 2004.

Personal life
He is married to Adela Botín. They have five children. They reside in Madrid, Spain. He was the owner of Head of a Young Woman, a painting by Pablo Picasso. He acquired the Adix yacht from Alan Bond in 1989.
In January, 2020 he was convicted of trafficking culturally important goods for attempting to illegally export the Picasso painting aboard the yacht. A Spanish judge fined him €91.7 million and sentenced him to 3 years in prison.

References

1936 births
Living people
People from Madrid
Spanish bankers
Spanish art collectors
Spanish billionaires
Members of the Board of Directors of the Banco Santander
University of Deusto alumni
University of Valladolid alumni